Eragrostis ciliaris, the gophertail lovegrass, is a species of grass (family Poaceae). It is native to the Old World Tropics; nearly all of Africa, Madagascar, other Indian Ocean islands, the Arabian Peninsula, the Indian Subcontinent, Myanmar, Vietnam, Taiwan and the Philippines and a number of Pacific islands, and has been introduced to the New World Tropics and Subtropics, from the southern United States to Argentina, the Caribbean, and other Pacific islands. Its seeds are edible and nutritious, but quite small and difficult to harvest and handle, so it is usually regarded as a famine food.

References

ciliaris
Flora of Africa
Flora of the Western Indian Ocean
Flora of the Arabian Peninsula
Flora of the Indian subcontinent
Flora of Myanmar
Flora of Vietnam
Flora of the Philippines
Flora of Taiwan
Flora of the Northwestern Pacific
Plants described in 1818